The 1988 POMIS Cup is the second championship, played at Rasmee Dhandu Stadium, Malé, Maldives.

Teams
The top four teams of 1987 Dhivehi League and two invited foreign clubs.

Teams and Nation
Note: Table lists clubs in alphabetical order.

  Club Lagoons
  Club Valencia
  New Radiant SC
  Renown Sports Club
  Victory Sports Club
  York SC

Groups
Group A
  York SC (Group Winners)
  Renown Sports Club
  Victory Sports Club

Group B
  New Radiant SC (Group Winners)
  Club Valencia
  Club Lagoons

Final

References
 POMIS CUP 1988 (In Dhivehi)

1988
1988 in Asian football
1988 in Maldivian football
1988 in Sri Lankan sport